Peirosauridae is a Gondwanan family of mesoeucrocodylians that lived during the Cretaceous period. It was a clade of terrestrial crocodyliforms that evolved a rather dog-like form, and were terrestrial carnivores. It was phylogenetically defined in 2004 as the most recent common ancestor of Peirosaurus and Lomasuchinae and all of its descendants. Lomasuchinae is a subfamily of peirosaurids that includes the genus Lomasuchus.

Lomasuchinae was defined in the same 2004 study as the most recent common ancestor of Lomasuchus and Mahajangasuchini and all of its descendants. Mahajangasuchini, also constructed in the study, was defined as the most recent common ancestor of Mahajangasuchus and Uberabasuchus and all of its descendants. However, all more recent phylogenetic analyses placed Mahajangasuchus within its own family, Mahajangasuchidae, along with the newly named Kaprosuchus.

Genera
The following list of genera follows Martinelli et al., 2012 unless otherwise noted.

Antaeusuchus from the Cenomanian of Morocco.
Barcinosuchus from the Aptian - Albian of Argentina.
Bayomesasuchus from the Turonian - Cenomanian of Argentina.
Barrosasuchus from the Santonian of Argentina.
Caririsuchus from the lower Albian of Brazil.
Colhuehuapisuchus from the Campanian- early Maastrichtian of Argentina.
Gasparinisuchus from the Santonian - early Campanian of Argentina. 
Hamadasuchus from the Albian - Cenomanian of Morocco.
Kinesuchus from the Santonian of Argentina.
Lomasuchus from the Santonian of Argentina.
Montealtosuchus from the Turonian - Santonian of Brazil.
Patagosuchus from the Coniacian of Argentina.
Peirosaurus from the late Maastrichtian of Brazil.
Rukwasuchus from the Cenomanian of Tanzania.
Uberabasuchus from the late Maastrichtian of Brazil.

References

I. d. S. Carvalho, F. M. d. Vasconcellos, and S. A. S. Tavares. (2007). Montealtosuchus arrudacamposi, a new peirosaurid crocodile (Mesoeucrocodylia) from the Late Cretaceous Adamantina Formation of Brazil. Zootaxa 1607:35-46

External links
 Description of Uberabasuchus
 Description of Montealtosuchus

Early Cretaceous crocodylomorphs
Terrestrial crocodylomorphs
 
Late Cretaceous crocodylomorphs
Early Cretaceous first appearances
Maastrichtian extinctions
Prehistoric reptile families